is an English land law case decided in the House of Lords on the relationship between potential overriding interests and the concept of overreaching.

The case was controversial because it construed the statutory framework so that interests which might have been overriding were denied that status because they could be overreached in appropriate circumstances.  In the following years, it has been questioned whether the overreaching rules, as interpreted by Flegg, are compatible with the qualified rights to peaceful enjoyment of possessions and/or the right to a family life and home guaranteed in the Convention on Human Rights. Currently it appears that they are.

Facts
In 1977, Mr and Mrs Flegg sold their home of 28 years and used the £18,000 they realised to help buy a new home, Bleak House. Their daughter and her husband, Mrs and Mr Maxwell-Brown also chose the house; they also put in the balance to buy (£16,000) by taking out a mortgage loan (with an earlier lender) which they would pay back. It was meant for them all to live in. The registered owners and therefore borrowers were the Maxwell-Browns, despite their solicitor advising all four of them be registered. The law means Mr and Mrs Flegg had an equitable property right, stake or share from their contributions which the Maxwell-Browns held on trust for them.. The Maxwell-Browns had money trouble and remortgaged with the City of London Building Society to raise £37,500 without the Fleggs' consent. The Fleggs were suspicious and entered a caution against dealings at the Land Registry. The two borrowers defaulted (fell into arrears with payments) and the building society sought possession.

Judgment

Court of Appeal
Dillon LJ held that, reversing the decision of the High Court, the Fleggs' interest in their home was not overreached through the building society's contract with the children.

Kerr LJ and Sir George Waller concurred.

House of Lords
The Judicial Committee of the House of Lords held that the building society’s charge took priority, and could use the overreaching defence against the Fleggs’ pre-existing trust right. Although under the Land Registration Act 1925 section 70, people with actual occupation may have an overriding interest that would take priority over a third party, like the building society, this does not happen if the purchase money is paid to two or more trustees or a trust corporation. If that happens, under Law of Property Act 1925, section 2(1)(ii), the interests of the beneficiaries will be overreached and will attach to the purchase price, not the property.

Lord Templeman said the following.

Lord Oliver gave a concurring, reasoned judgment.

Lords Mackay, Bridge and Goff concurred with both.

Significance
City of London BS v Flegg has come under substantial criticism, firstly, for misinterpreting the scheme of the statutes (as the Court of Appeal would have come to a different result) and more recently for potentially infringing the European Convention on Human Rights, either article 8 on the right to a home and family life, or Protocol 1, article on peaceful enjoyment of possessions. However, other commentators regard it as an accurate statement of the current law and there is no evidence to suggest that the decision contravenes the European Convention.

See also

English land law

Notes and references
Notes

References

References
N Gravells (ed), Landmark Cases in Land Law (2013)
C Harpum, 'Overreaching, Trustees' Powers and the Reform of the 1925 Legislation' (1990) 49(2) Cambridge Law Journal 277
N Jackson, 'Overreaching in Registered Land Law' (2006) 69 Modern Law Review 237

English property case law
English land case law
House of Lords cases
1987 in British law
1987 in case law